Eupulmonata is a taxonomic clade of air-breathing snails. The great majority of this group are land snails and slugs, but some are marine and some are saltmarsh snails that can tolerate salty conditions.

Linnean taxonomy
Suborder Eupulmonata Haszprunar & Huber, 1990
Infraorder Acteophila Dall, 1885 (= formerly Archaeopulmonata)
Superfamily Melampoidea Stimpson, 1851
Infraorder Trimusculiformes Minichev & Starobogatov, 1975
Superfamily Trimusculoidea Zilch, 1959
Infraorder Stylommatophora A. Schmidt, 1856 (land snails)
Subinfraorder Orthurethra
Superfamily Achatinelloidea Gulick, 1873
Superfamily Cochlicopoidea Pilsbry, 1900
Superfamily Partuloidea Pilsbry, 1900
Superfamily Pupilloidea Turton, 1831
Subinfraorder Sigmurethra
Superfamily Acavoidea Pilsbry, 1895
Superfamily Achatinoidea Swainson, 1840
Superfamily Aillyoidea Baker, 1960
Superfamily Arionoidea J.E. Gray in Turnton, 1840
Superfamily Buliminoidea Clessin, 1879
Superfamily Camaenoidea Pilsbry, 1895
Superfamily Clausilioidea Mörch, 1864
Superfamily Dyakioidea Gude & Woodward, 1921
Superfamily Gastrodontoidea Tryon, 1866
Superfamily Helicoidea Rafinesque, 1815
Superfamily Helixarionoidea Bourguignat, 1877
Superfamily Limacoidea Rafinesque, 1815
Superfamily Oleacinoidea H. & A. Adams, 1855
Superfamily Orthalicoidea Albers-Martens, 1860
Superfamily Plectopylidoidea Moellendorf, 1900
Superfamily Polygyroidea Pilsbry, 1894
Superfamily Punctoidea Morse, 1864
Superfamily Rhytidoidea Pilsbry, 1893
Superfamily Sagdidoidera Pilsbry, 1895
Superfamily Staffordioidea Thiele, 1931
Superfamily Streptaxoidea J.E. Gray, 1806
Superfamily Strophocheiloidea Thiele, 1926
Superfamily Trigonochlamydoidea Hese, 1882
Superfamily Zonitoidea Mörch, 1864

2005 taxonomy 
In the taxonomy of the Gastropoda (Bouchet & Rocroi, 2005) Eupulmonata is an unranked clade.

Clade Eupulmonata 
Contains the clades Systellommatophora and Stylommatophora
Superfamily Trimusculoidea
Family Trimusculidae
Superfamily Otinoidea
Family Otinidae
Family Smeagolidae
Superfamily Ellobioidea
Family Ellobiidae

Clade Systellommatophora (Gymnomorpha) 
Superfamily Onchidioidea
Family Onchidiidae
Superfamily Veronicelloidea
Family Veronicellidae
Family Rathouisiidae

Clade Stylommatophora 
Contains the subclades Elasmognatha, Orthurethra and the informal group Sigmurethra

Subclade Elasmognatha 
Superfamily Succineoidea
Family Succineidae
Superfamily Athoracophoroidea
Family Athoracophoridae

Subclade Orthurethra 
Superfamily Partuloidea
Family Partulidae
Family Draparnaudiidae
Superfamily Achatinelloidea
Family Achatinellidae
Superfamily Cochlicopoidea
Family Cochlicopidae
Family Amastridae
Superfamily Pupilloidea
Family Pupillidae
Family Argnidae
Family Chondrinidae
 † Family Cylindrellinidae
Family Lauriidae
Family Orculidae
Family Pleurodiscidae
Family Pyramidulidae
Family Spelaeodiscidae
Family Strobilopsidae
Family Valloniidae
Family Vertiginidae
Superfamily Enoidea
Family Enidae
Family Cerastidae

Informal Group Sigmurethra 
Superfamily Clausilioidea
Family Clausiliidae
 † Family Anadromidae
 † Family Filholiidae
 † Family Palaeostoidae
Superfamily Orthalicoidea
Family Orthalicidae
Family Cerionidae
Family Coelociontidae
 † Family Grangerellidae
Family Megaspiridae
Family Placostylidae
Family Urocoptidae
Superfamily Achatinoidea
Family Achatinidae
Family Ferussaciidae
Family Micractaeonidae
Family Subulinidae
Superfamily Aillyoidea
Family Aillyidae
Superfamily Testacelloidea
Family Testacellidae
Family Oleacinidae
Family Spiraxidae
Superfamily Papillodermatoidea
Family Papillodermatidae
Superfamily Streptaxoidea
Family Streptaxidae
Superfamily  Rhytidoidea
Family Rhytididae
Family Chlamydephoridae
Family Haplotrematidae
Family Scolodontidae
Superfamily Acavoidea
Family Acavidae
Family Caryodidae
Family Dorcasiidae
Family Macrocyclidae
Family Megomphicidae
Family Strophocheilidae
Superfamily Punctoidea
Family Punctidae
 † Family Anastomopsidae
Family Charopidae
Family Cystopeltidae
Family Discidae
Family Endodontidae
Family Helicodiscidae
Family Oreohelicidae
Family Thyrophorellidae
Superfamily Sagdoidea
Family Sagdidae

"Limacoid clade" 
Superfamily Staffordioidea
Family Staffordiidae
Superfamily Dyakioidea
Family Dyakiidae
Superfamily Gastrodontoidea
Family Gastrodontidae
Family Chronidae
Family Euconulidae
Family Oxychilidae
Family Pristilomatidae
Family Trochomorphidae
Fossil taxa probably belonging to the Gastrodontoidea
Subfamily † Archaeozonitinae
Subfamily † Grandipatulinae
Subfamily † Palaeoxestininae
Superfamily Parmacelloidea
Family Parmacellidae
Family Milacidae
Family Trigonochlamydidae
Superfamily Zonitoidea
Family Zonitidae
Superfamily Helicarionoidea
Family Helicarionidae
Family Ariophantidae
Family Urocyclidae
Superfamily Limacoidea
Family Limacidae
Family Agriolimacidae
Family Boettgerillidae
Family Vitrinidae
Superfamily Arionoidea
Family Arionidae
Family Anadenidae
Family Ariolimacidae
Family Binneyidae
Family Oopeltidae
Family Philomycidae
Superfamily Helicoidea
Family Helicidae
Family Bradybaenidae
Family Camaenidae
Family Cepolidae
Family Cochlicellidae
Family Elonidae
Family Epiphragmophoridae
Family Halolimnohelicidae
Family Helicodontidae
Family Helminthoglyptidae
Family Humboldtianidae
Family Hygromiidae
Family Monadeniidae
Family Pleurodontidae
Family Polygyridae
Family Sphincterochilidae
Family Thysanophoridae
Family Trissexodontidae
Family Xanthonychidae

References

Panpulmonata